Barpeta Girls' College is an undergraduate college established in the year 1978 at Barpeta of Barpeta district in Assam. The college is affiliated to Gauhati University.

Departments
 Assamese
 English
 Economics
 Education
 Philosophy
 Political Science
 Anthropology
 Home Science
 Commerce

Accreditation
In 2016 the college has been awarded "B" grade by National Assessment and Accreditation Council.  The college is also recognised by University Grants Commission (India).

References

External links
 http://Barpetagirlscollege.org

Colleges affiliated to Gauhati University
Universities and colleges in Assam
Barpeta district
1978 establishments in Assam
Educational institutions established in 1978